Sertolovo is a town in Vsevolozhsky District of Leningrad Oblast, Russia, located north of St. Petersburg. Population:

History

It was founded in 1936 on the place of a former settlement of Ingrian Finns, whose inhabitants were deported. The settlement was mentioned in earlier sources as Sirotala. In 1936, military personnel moved in and in 1939–1940, Sertolovo was used as a base from where troops were sent to the Winter War. From the beginning, Sertolovo was a part of Vsevolozhsky District of Leningrad Oblast. During World War II, it was not occupied and was together with the city of Leningrad surrounded by German and Finnish troops. After the war, there was almost no civil population in Sertolovo, until massive housing construction started in the 1950s. In 1977, Sertolovo was granted urban-type settlement status, and in 1998, town status. It was the town of oblast significance until 2010, when the administrative structure of Leningrad Oblast was harmonized with its municipal structure. At that time, Sertolovo became a town of district significance.

Administrative and municipal status
Within the framework of administrative divisions, it is, together with the settlement of Zapadnaya Litsa, incorporated within Vsevolozhsky District as Sertolovskoye Settlement Municipal Formation. As a municipal division, Sertolovskoye Settlement Municipal Formation is incorporated within Vsevolozhsky Municipal District as Sertolovskoye Urban Settlement.

Economy
The economy of Sertolovo is based on military installations. About 70% of the population as of 2009 were the military personnel and their families.

Industry
Industrial enterprises in Sertolovo produce concrete constructions and plastic containers.

Transportation
Sertolovo is essentially a suburb of St. Petersburg and is included into the suburban road network. In particular, it is located on the highway heading in the direction of Vyborg.

The town is several kilometers northeast of the Pesochnaya railway platform located on the railroad which connects St. Petersburg and Vyborg.

References

Notes

Sources

Cities and towns in Leningrad Oblast
Vsevolozhsky District
Sankt-Peterburgsky Uyezd
Karelian Isthmus